"Where Do I Begin" is a song by English big beat musical duo the Chemical Brothers, released as a promotional single in 1997 from their second album, Dig Your Own Hole. As a promo release, copies are difficult to get hold of. The version appearing on the single is the radio edit and is shorter than the version on the album. Beth Orton sings the vocals on the song.

"Where Do I Begin" appears in many films and media. It can be heard in an episode of Blue Jam. It was featured in the Cameron Crowe film Vanilla Sky (2001) and was included on the released original soundtrack. The song was also featured in the film Monster (2003) starring Charlize Theron, as well as in the 2003 season three finale of the Showtime television series Queer as Folk during a scene in which the character Ted checks himself into rehab. The song was featured again in the film Accepted (2006) starring Justin Long. It was featured in the trailer for the Wes Craven film Red Eye (2005).

Track listing 

1996 songs
1997 singles
1990s ballads
The Chemical Brothers songs
Trip hop songs
Torch songs
Songs written by Tom Rowlands
Songs written by Ed Simons